State of Grace is the fourth album by the Street Dogs. It was released on July 8, 2008. It was produced by Ted Hutt and is the band's first album on Hellcat Records. It includes a cover of The Skids' "Into the Valley". The album was released in Japan with an exclusive bonus track.

Track listing

Meanings of songs

According to McColgan, he always looked up to his uncle and role-model, Kevin O'Toole, who became the subject of "Kevin J. O'Toole."

The song "Two Angry Kids" is reportedly a reminiscing of the times spent with Dropkick Murphys bassist Ken Casey.

"San Patricios" is about a group of Irish immigrants who defected from the United States Army during the Mexican-American War.

"The General's Boombox" is a song about and dedicated to Joe Strummer of The Clash

Credits
Mike McColgan – vocals
Johnny Rioux – bass, backing vocals, mandolin, harmonica, acoustic guitar
Marcus Hollar – lead guitar, backing vocals, dobro, pump organ, acoustic guitar
Tobe Bean III - rhythm guitar, slide guitar, dobro
Paul Rucker – drums
Ted Hutt – producing
Heather Waters - Vocals on "Elizabeth"
Rudy Johnson - Vocals on "San Patricios"
Dram - Bagpipes and drums on "Kevin J. O'Toole"
Lorne Cousin - Bagpipes on "State Of Grace"
Steve Sidelnyk - Marching Snare Drum on "State Of Grace"
Gavin Watson - Photographer of cover art

References

Street Dogs albums
2008 albums
Hellcat Records albums